The saenghwang is a Korean wind instrument.  It is a free reed mouth organ derived from (and quite similar to) the Chinese sheng, though its tuning is different.  

It is constructed from 17 bamboo pipes, each with a metal free reed, mounted vertically in a windchest.  Traditionally the saenghwang's windchest was made out of a dried gourd but it is now more commonly made of metal or wood.  In contrast to other Korean traditional instruments, it is not well known today, even in Korea, and very few musicians are able to play it.  It is used primarily in chamber music, usually in combination with instruments such as the danso (vertical flute) and yanggeum (hammered dulcimer)  The instrument was referred to historically as saeng. The saenghwang was used together with other instruments in the early Joseon Dynasty, and was used as an important instrument even in the late Joseon Dynasty.

The range is from Hwangjong (黃: E♭) to Cheongnam-Ryo (湳: C). Excluding the Ui-gwan, the 16 coffins produced 12-yul and 4 auditory sounds, but since they began to be used for Hyang-ak, they have a wider range. It is the only polyphonic musical instrument among Korean traditional instruments. The tone is fine and beautiful. Usually, 3 notes are produced simultaneously, 2 notes are octave, and 1 note 4 or 5 degrees below.

Gisaeng (Korean female entertainers) are often depicted playing saenghwang in old Korean paintings.

See also
Korean music
Sheng (instrument)
Shō

References

External links
Saenghwang page
Saenghwang page (with audio sample)
Painting and poem describing saenghwang

Free reed aerophones
Korean musical instruments